Genoplesium turfosum, commonly known as the alpine midge orchid, is a small terrestrial orchid endemic to a small area in the higher parts of New South Wales. It has a single thin leaf fused to the flowering stem and up to twenty five dark purplish-red, crowded flowers with a sparsely hairy labellum.

Description
As with others in the genus, the flowers are inverted so that the labellum is above the column rather than below it. There is a dark purplish-black callus in the centre of the labellum and extending almost to its tip. Flowering occurs in November and December.

Taxonomy and naming
Genoplesium turfosum was first formally described in 1991 by David Jones and the description was published in Australian Orchid Research. In 2002, David Jones and Mark Clements changed the name to Corunastylis turfosa but the change is not accepted by the Australian Plant Census. The specific epithet (turfosum) is a Latin word meaning "peaty" or "boggy", referring to the habitat of this orchid.

Distribution and habitat
The alpine midge orchid grows with dense sedges in boggy places in the Kosciuszko National Park.

References

turfosum
Endemic orchids of Australia
Orchids of New South Wales
Plants described in 1991